Bryophyllum (from the Greek  bryon/bryein = sprout,  phyllon = leaf) is a group of plant species of the family Crassulaceae native to Madagascar. 
It is a section or subgenus within the genus Kalanchoe, and was formerly placed at the level of genus. 
This section is notable for vegetatively growing small plantlets on the fringes of the leaves; these eventually drop off and root. These plantlets arise from mitosis of meristematic-type tissue in notches in the leaves.

Nowadays, bryophyllums are naturalized in many parts of the tropics and subtropics, and deliberately cultivated for their attractiveness or for their interesting reproduction as a vegetative reproductive plant.

Taxonomy 

Species of Bryophyllum are nested within Kalanchoe on molecular phylogenetic analysis. Therefore, Bryophyllum should be a section of Kalanchoe rather than a separate genus.

The number of species within Bryophyllum varies with definitions of this section. Bryophyllum used to include not only species that produce plantlets on the leaf margin, but also many species that lack this character such as K. manginii and K. porphyrocalyx. However, the broadly defined Bryophyllum is polyphyletic. Bernard Descoings redefined Bryophyllum as 26 species, and molecular phylogenetic analysis shows that his definition is almost monophyletic, except that K. beauverdii (hence as well as its hybrid K. × poincarei) and K. delagoensis (hence as well as its hybrids K. × houghtonii and K. × richaudii) should be included and K. pubescens excluded. Therefore, Bryophyllum comprises about 30 species:
 Kalanchoe beauverdii
 Kalanchoe bogneri
 Kalanchoe cymbifolia
 Kalanchoe daigremontiana
 Kalanchoe delagoensis
 Kalanchoe fedtschenkoi
 Kalanchoe gastonis-bonnieri
 Kalanchoe × houghtonii: K. daigremontiana × K. delagoensis
 Kalanchoe humifica
 Kalanchoe × laetivirens: K. daigremontiana × K. sp. (probably K. laxiflora)
 Kalanchoe laxiflora
 Kalanchoe × lokarana: K. laxiflora × K. sp.
 Kalanchoe macrochlamys
 Kalanchoe marnieriana
 Kalanchoe maromokotrensis
 Kalanchoe mortagei
 Kalanchoe peltigera
 Kalanchoe pinnata
 Kalanchoe × poincarei: K. beauverdii × K. sp.
 Kalanchoe prolifera
 Kalanchoe × rechingeri: K. beauverdii × K. sp. (K. delagoensis or K. rosei)
 Kalanchoe × richaudii: K. delagoensis × K. rosei
 Kalanchoe rosei
 Kalanchoe rubella
 Kalanchoe sanctula
 Kalanchoe serrata
 Kalanchoe streptantha
 Kalanchoe suarezensis
 Kalanchoe tenuiflora
 Kalanchoe waldheimii

Toxicity
Several species of Kalanchoe are economically important for causing cardiotoxic effects in sheep and cattle, and diseases affecting the nervous system and muscles known as krimpsiekte ("shrinking disease") or as cotyledonosis. Kalanchoe pinnata may have similar chemical components, bufadienolide alkaloids.

References

External links
 
 

 
Crassulaceae genera